Gunkha is a small village in Botlikh district in Dagestan, Russia

Geography 
It is located 14 km northeast of the village Botlikh, on the left bank of the Unsatlen River.

Demographics 
The villagers speak the Andean language. In 1981, a linguistic expedition Department of Structural and Applied Linguistics of the Faculty of Philology MSU led by A. E. Kibrika.

References 

Rural localities in Botlikhsky District